The Evangelical Baptist Church of the Central African Republic (Église Évangélique Baptiste en République Centrafricaine) is a Baptist Christian denomination, affiliated with the Baptist World Alliance, in Central African Republic. The headquarters is in Berbérati, Central African Republic.

History

The Evangelical Baptist Church of the Central African Republic started with a Swedish mission in 1923.  Its foundation dates back to the establishment of the first Baptist Church in 1925. 

According to a denomination census released in 2020, it claimed 237 churches and 68,397 members.

See also 
 Bible
 Born again
 Worship service (evangelicalism)
 Jesus Christ
 Believers' Church

References

External links
 Official Website

Baptist Christianity in the Central African Republic
Baptist denominations in Africa